Lauren Cobello (Formerly Greutman) (born January 1981) is an American consumer savings expert, author, spokeswoman, public speaker, blogger and lifestyle television personality.

Early life and education
Cobello was born in Saratoga Springs, New York where she grew up with her parents, two sisters, and one brother. From 1999 to 2003, Lauren attended the State University of New York at Oswego, where she played collegiate field hockey and received her Bachelor of Science in Public Justice. Lauren currently lives in Upstate New York with her four children, Andrew, Hannah, Kaylee, and Abby. She also is the founder and owner of the Personal Finance Planner company, which sells planners to help people organize their finances and pay down debt.

Career 

In 2008, Lauren had accumulated $40,000 in debt. In 2010, Lauren founded I am THAT Lady, later renamed LaurenCobello.com, to offer advice and guidance to women who found themselves in debt due to poor personal finance habits such as overspending. By 2012 she was debt free, and the skills she acquired along the way inspired the creation of her small business aimed at helping people in similar situations. In 2014, Greutman began distributing meal plans to feed a family for a month for around $150.

After starting her business in 2010, Lauren began appearing on local news channels and publications offering advice on how to live frugally and get out of debt. Over the years Lauren has moved on to appear on nationally syndicated shows including The Today Show, ABC News, NBC News, Dr. Oz, Rachael Ray, and Fox & Friends.

In addition, she has appeared as the cover stories in Syracuse Magazine and Oswego County Business News Magazine, and featured as an interview subject in publications including BBC, U.S. News & World Report, Time, MarketWatch, Business Insider, Oprah, Forbes, Fast Company, The Huffington Post, The Philadelphia Inquirer, The Las Vegas Review-Journal, Chase Bank, Go Banking Rates, Nerd Wallet, Kiplinger, Wise Bread, The Week, and The Fiscal Times.

Greutman continues to write at her own site, and is a contributor at U.S. News & World Report, The Huffington Post, and Clark Howard.

Greutman published her first book, How to Coupon Effectively in 2013. Her second book The Recovering Spender was  published by Hachette Book Group in 2016.

Bibliography 
 How to Coupon Effectively: Save $5,200 per year in just 2 hours per week (Self-Published, 2013)
 The Recovering Spender (Hachette Book Group, 2016)

External links 
 LaurenCobello.com
 The Recovering Spender
 The Personal Finance Planner

References 

Living people
American finance and investment writers
1981 births